Eugène Martin (March 24, 1915 in Suresnes – October 12, 2006 in Aytre) was a racing driver from France.  He participated in two Formula One World Championship Grands Prix, debuting on May 13, 1950.  He scored no championship points.

Martin is better known for his participation in several of the prewar grands prix. He won the first Grand Prix Aix les Bains Circuit du Lac in 1949 with a Jicey-BMW developed by Jean Caillas.

In the 1950s he embarked on a brief career as an auto-maker, working at the Paris-based garage he owned with his father to produce the Martin-Spéciale.   The car was exhibited at the 1952 Paris Motor Show but never progressed to series production.

He was one of the last surviving drivers from that era until his death at a hospital near his home in La Rochelle in 2006.

Complete Formula One World Championship results
(key)

References

External links
 Profile at oldracingcars.com

French racing drivers
French Formula One drivers
Talbot Formula One drivers
1915 births
2006 deaths
24 Hours of Le Mans drivers
World Sportscar Championship drivers